Stygobromus onondagaensis, commonly called Onondaga Cave amphipod, is a troglomorphic species of amphipod in family Crangonyctidae. It is native to Arkansas, Kansas, Missouri and Oklahoma in the United States.

See also
Onondaga Cave State Park

References

Freshwater crustaceans of North America
Cave crustaceans
Crustaceans described in 1940
onondagaensis